VIMS may refer to:

Motion sickness (Visually Induced Motion Sickness), the discomfort experienced when motion is seen but not felt.
Vijayanagara Institute of Medical Sciences, a medical college in Bellary, India
Virginia Institute of Marine Science, a graduate school for the study of oceanography at The College of William & Mary in Williamsburg, Virginia, USA
Visual and Infrared Mapping Spectrometer, an instrument of the Cassini robotic spacecraft mission
Vivekananda Institute of Medical Sciences, a medical institution & hospital in Kolkata, India